Ruut Sjöblom (born 23 August 1976 in Tuusula) is a Finnish politician currently serving in the Parliament of Finland for the National Coalition Party at the Uusimaa constituency.

References

1976 births
Living people
People from Tuusula
National Coalition Party politicians
Members of the Parliament of Finland (2019–23)
21st-century Finnish women politicians
Women members of the Parliament of Finland